Ivan Ljubičić was the defending champion but lost in the second round to Kristian Pless.

Paul-Henri Mathieu won in the final 4–6, 6–3, 6–1 against Gustavo Kuerten.

Seeds

  Marat Safin (quarterfinals)
  Yevgeny Kafelnikov (second round)
  Sébastien Grosjean (quarterfinals)
  Thomas Johansson (second round)
  Younes El Aynaoui (first round)
  Fernando González (second round)
  Max Mirnyi (second round)
  Ivan Ljubičić (second round)

Draw

Finals

Top half

Bottom half

References
 2002 Grand Prix de Tennis de Lyon Main Draw
 2002 Grand Prix de Tennis de Lyon Qualifying Draw

Singles
Singles